Neodiprion sertifer, the European pine sawfly or red pine sawfly, is a sawfly species in the genus Neodiprion.  Although native to Europe, it was accidentally introduced to North America in 1925.

The larvae of Exhyalanthrax afer feed on N. sertifer cocoons.

(+)-Catechin 7-O-β-glucoside, isorhamnetin 3,7,4′-tri-O-β-glucoside, kaempferol 3,7,4′-tri-O-β-glucoside and quercetin 3,7,4′-tri-O-β-glucoside can be isolated from the hemolymph of N. sertifer.  None of these compounds is present in the needles of P. sylvestris, therefore, these flavonoid glucosides are produced by the larvae from flavonoid monoglucosides and (+)-catechin obtained from the pine needles.

Life cycle
The European pine sawfly typically hatches from early April to late May.  The larvae feed on existing pine needles.  When they mature, they spin into cocoons.  In the fall, they leave their cocoons as wasp-like creatures and mate.  September and October are when the female lays eggs in pine trees for the next generation.  Their favorite trees are Scots pine, red pine, Jack pine, and Japanese pines.

Pest
The European pine sawfly is considered a pest as it eats a lot of needles.  While this can stunt the growth of the tree, it rarely is enough to kill the tree.  For controlling it, one can use natural parasites, remove the eggs from the tree, or spray pesticides.  Any standard pesticide sprayed on them during their larval stage will kill them.  Spraying is usually done very early, often when they're first spotted.

Gallery

See also 
 List of introduced species

References

External links 

 

Tenthredinoidea
Insects described in 1785
Insect pests of temperate forests